Chant is a lunar impact crater that is located on the far side of the Moon, behind the southwest limb as seen from the Earth. It lies within the southwestern part of the  blanket of ejecta surrounding the Mare Orientale, beyond the Montes Cordillera mountain ring. To the west-northwest is the large walled plain Blackett. Southward is the crater Mendel.

This is a nearly circular crater with a slight outward bulge in the northeast wall. The outer rim is sharp-edged, and the inner sides slope directly downward with only some minor terraces along the east wall. The interior floor is somewhat irregular, particularly in the southern half. There is a small central peak at the midpoint of the floor.

The name Chant was officially adopted by the International Astronomical Union in 1970 and named for Clarence Chant.

This crater lies to the northwest of the Mendel-Rydberg Basin, a 630 km wide impact basin of Nectarian age.

References

 
 
 
 
 
 
 
 
 
 
 
 

Impact craters on the Moon